Yurdyuk-Kumakh (Ürdük Kumax) is a rural locality (a selo) in Chyorumchinsky Rural Okrug of Verkhoyansky District in the Sakha Republic, Russia, located  from Batagay, the administrative center of the district and  from Chyoryumche, the administrative center of the rural okrug. Its population as of the 2010 Census was 1; down from 2 recorded in the 2002 Census. Within the framework of municipal divisions, Yurdyuk-Kumakh is a part of Elgessky Rural Settlement in Verkhoyansky Municipal District.

References

Notes

Sources
Official website of the Sakha Republic. Registry of the Administrative-Territorial Divisions of the Sakha Republic. Verkhoyansky District. 

Rural localities in Verkhoyansky District